New Karachi Town lies in the northern part of the city Gulberg Town. It was formed when katchi abadis were resettled following the 1958 coup d'état. In 2001 it was subdivided into 13 union councils. The town system was disbanded in 2011, and New Karachi Town was re-organized as part of Karachi Central District in 2015.

Location 
New Karachi is in the northern part of Karachi, Pakistan, located between the Lyari River, the Manghopir Hills and two major roads – Surjani Road to the north and Shahrah-e-Zahid Hussain to the south. To the north and west is Gadap Town, and to the south lie the towns of Gulberg Town and North Nazimabad Town. The population of New Karachi Town was estimated to be more than 680,000 at the 1998 census.

History

After the 1958 Pakistani coup d'état, the military decided to forcibly resettle the katchi abadis of Karachi into freshly created townships such as New Karachi. The federal government under the ruling of Pervez Musharraf, who seized power in a 1999 coup d'etat, introduced local government reforms in the year 2000, which eliminated the previous "third tier of government" (administrative divisions) and replaced it with the fourth tier (districts). The effect in Karachi was the dissolution of the former Karachi Division in 2001, and the merging of its five districts to form a new Karachi City-District with eighteen autonomous constituent towns including New Karachi Town. In 2011, the system was disbanded but remained in place for bureaucratic administration until 2015, when the Karachi Metropolitan Corporation system was re-introduced. In 2015, New Karachi Town was re-organized as part of Karachi Central district.

Neighbourhoods
Fatima Jinnah Colony is named after Fatima Jinnah, the sister of the founder of Pakistan, Muhammad Ali Jinnah. The neighbourhood of Hakim Ahsan is named after the mayor of Karachi who met Muhammad Ali Jinnah at Karachi airport in 1947. Shah Nawaz Bhutto Colony is named after the father of the former Prime Minister of Pakistan Zulfikar Ali Bhutto and grandfather of the later Prime Minister Benazir Bhutto. Shah Nawaz Bhutto was the last Prime Minister of the princely state of Junagadh and was instrumental in the accession of the state to Pakistan in 1947. Sir Syed Colony is named after Sir Syed Ahmad Khan who promoted education amongst the Muslims of British India and founded the Aligarh Muslim University in 1875.

Educational institutions
 Madina-Tur-Rehan Progressive Academy, 48/14 5-F New Karachi
 public schools
 public colleges, including one public technical college
 private schools, including:
 MIDasia Foundation Academy, North Karachi
MA Tutor Academy (Shadman Town, North Karachi)
SK Grammar School (Muslim Town, North Karachi)
Pak Horizon Grammar School (Sector 11-F North Karachi)
Madina Tul Ilm High School North Karachi
High Star Public School (North Karachi)
Dawn Public School, North Karachi
Lycos Grammar School (11/C/1, North Karachi)
Wonderland Grammar School (B-41, 11/C/1, North Karachi)
Saeeda Academy ( 11/C/1, North Karachi)
Asra Public School (U.P More North Karachi)
Karachi Generation School (11-B, near Saleem Centre, North Karachi)
Dawn Public School, North Karachi
SK Grammar School, North Karachi
Little Flower Children Secondary School (Muslim Town North Karachi)
Al Rahman Grammar School, North Karachi
Dawn Public School, North Karachi
S.M.B. Academy School Boys & Girls, North Karachi
Woodland Secondary School, North Karachi
Little Orchard Academy Shadman Town No 2, North Karachi
Green Land Public School, North Karachi
The Metropolitan Academy
Usman Public School, North Karachi

Hospitals
 16 private hospitals: a good hospital is Godhra Shaikh Muslim Medical Center in Sector 11-G
Qadri Medical Center (5-B/1)
 3 public hospitals
 New Karachi Medical Centre (11-F)
 24 Hours Hospital ( 11-F)
 Rasheed Ullah Qazi Hospital (11-F)
 Arif Emergency Medical centre  11-F
 Sindh Government Hospital (11-I near Geo Mobile Market - UP)
 Ausaaf Hospital (5C-2 near Baardha Market)
 Mujtabai Hospital (Sector 5K & 5L near Bilal Police Station)
 Saylani Emergency Medical Centre 24-Hours near Sindhi Hotel in Sector 5-E, Opp, 4K Market
 Muslim Khatri Medical centre near Sindhi Hotel in Sector 5-E, front of Saylani Medical Centre 
 Iram Emergency Hospital & Maternity 24-Hours sometimes in Sector 5-E near 4K Market
 Anees-ul-Rehman Clinic (Child Specialist) (together with Zahid Sweets near Do Minuts)
 Rasheedullah Emergency Hospital 11-F (near 5 Number Bus Stop)
 Pasha Maternity Emergency Hospital in Sector 11-D, with Front Sector 5-E (near 5 Number Bus Stop)
 Godhra Muslim Khatri 24-Hours Emergency Hospital (Sector 11-G near W-11 Bus Stop) Main Hospital after Sindh Government
 Aiwan-e-Sanat-o-Tijarat Hospital: Address: St.1/1, Sec.11, C-2, Sir Syed Town, North Karachi
 SHED Hospital North Karachi. Contact. Plot No. ST 1/2-A Sector 11-C-2 North Karachi,
 Government Urban Hospital : Address: Sector 5C-3, North Karachi

Places of worship
 207 mosques

Some famous mosques are:

Jama Masjid Hanfia (Near Government School 11-F) 

Markazi Islamia Masjid
Masjid Ibrahim khalilullah 5c-4
Jama Masjid Rahmania Sector 5c-4
Jama Masjid Siddiquia 5-G
Jama Masjid Hanfia (Sofaid Masjid 5-E)
Jama Masjid Makki (5-E)
Jama Masjid Momin (near Apwa School 5-E)
Jama Masjid Memon (5-E)
Jama Masjid Ahl-e-Hadees (between 11-D & 5-E, near Islamia School)
Jama Masjid Riyaz ul Jannah sector 7d
Jama Masjid Khizra
Jama Masjid Quba Kalyana Town North Karachi
Jama Masjid Farooq-e-Azam Sector 11-G
Jama Masjid Riyaz ul Jannah sector 7d
Jama Masjid Muslim Town
Jama Masjid Allah wali 11-K
Jama Masjid Farooqiya 11-L
Jama Masjid Noor 11-L
Jama Masjid Rahmatul Lilaalameen 11-D
Jama Masjid Baghdai (11-D)
Jama Masjid Ghosia 11-D
Jama Masjid Bukhari, near Jamat Khana 11-D
Jama Masjid Akbari 11-D
Masjid Furqania
Masjid Bilal
Masjid Abu Bakr
Masjid Umar
Masjid Usmani Ghani
Masjid Ali
Masjid Ayesha Siddique
Masjid Farooq e Azam 5.c/1
Jamia Masjid Makki Sector 5-C.4
Masjid-e-Aqsa 11-F
 10 Imambargah
 4 churches
 1 mandir
 Jama masjid Islamia Sector 11-F Mohalla Kaghzian

Parks
 Arif Hussain (Shaheed) Model Park (11-B, North Karachi)
 Nasir Hussain (Shaheed) Model Park (11-G, North Karachi)
 Muhammad Shareef (Shaheed) Park (5/E, New Karachi)
 Nazir Hussain (Late) Model Park (11-B, North Karachi)
 Abu Nasar Park (Late) Model Park (Kalyana Town, North Karachi)
 Rashid Mehnaz Family Park (5.c./1, North Karachi) (formerly known as afza family park)
 Bi Ammaan Park (11.C, North Karachi, near Nagan Interchange)

Sports grounds
 7 play grounds
 1 new talent sports ka ground New Karachi 5a/1 me
 Abbasi sports ground sector 5-G

Major streets
 Shahrah-e-Khursheed Begum (Nagan Roundabout to Surjani Roundabout)
 7000 Road (Godhra Camp to Allah Wali Roundabout Chowrangi)
 9000 Road (Gabol Town to Saba Roundabout)
 5200 Road (Sindh Government Hospital to Kala School)
 5200 Road (Bashir Chowk to Sindhi hotel)

Police stations
 Industrial Area Police Station
 Khowaja Ajmair Nagri Police Station
 Sir Syed Police Station
 New Karachi Police Station
 Bilal Colony Police Station

Industrial area
 2500 industries

Commercial areas and markets

 Chaandni Chowk Market (11-F)
 Kids Garments Wholesale Market (11-G)
 Nala Watercourse
 Godhra Timber Market
 Chand Market (Sector 5-G)
 Gosht / Sabzi Market (Sector 5-J, Sindhi Hotel)
 Lal Market (Sector 5-F)
 Mughal House (Sector 5-F)
 Mutahida Bazar (Sindhi Hotel, New Karachi)
 Usmania Bazar (Sector 5-B)
 U.P. Sarafa Market (Sector 11-E)
 Sir Syed  Market (Sector 11-C)
 Roshan Travel and Tours (Sector 11-I)
 Bashir Chowk (Sector 5-G)
 Car Bazar 11-D
 Budh Bazaar(Wednesday) Bazaar 11-D
 Dhaga and Kapra Market 11-G
 Khatri Bazaar
 Jumeraat Bazar
 5-c-4 North Karachi Bara Market.
 W9 bazar between 5c/1 and 5c/3

References

External links
 New Karachi Town
 Daily New Karachi Town News

 
Karachi Central District
Towns in Karachi